The Evanger Power Station  is a hydroelectric power station located in the municipality Voss in Vestland, Norway. The average annual production is 1,435 GWh.

See also

References 

Hydroelectric power stations in Norway
Buildings and structures in Vestland
Dams in Norway
Voss